Bills of Exchange Act may refer to:

 Bills of Exchange Act 1882
 Bills of Exchange Act 1908